Entylomella is a genus of smut fungi in the family Entylomataceae. The genus, which contains anamorph forms of Entyloma species, was circumscribed in 1924 by Franz Xaver Rudolf von Höhnel.

Species
Entylomella callitriches
Entylomella chrysanthemi
Entylomella circinans
Entylomella ellisii
Entylomella geranii
Entylomella guaranitica
Entylomella leontices
Entylomella lobeliae
Entylomella meliloti
Entylomella microspora
Entylomella oenotherae
Entylomella oenotherae-biennis
Entylomella pfaffii
Entylomella premnicola
Entylomella saussureae
Entylomella schinziana
Entylomella sidae-rhombifoliae
Entylomella sii-latifolii
Entylomella smarodsii
Entylomella veronicae
Entylomella veronicae-cymbalariae
Entylomella veronicicola
Entylomella winteri

References

External links

Ustilaginomycotina
Basidiomycota genera
Taxa named by Franz Xaver Rudolf von Höhnel
Taxa described in 1924